There are two places in New Zealand called Waverley:

Waverley, Otago is a suburb of Dunedin
Waverley, Taranaki is a town in the western North Island